Stenalia testacea is a beetle in the genus Stenalia of the family Mordellidae. It was described in 1787 by Johan Christian Fabricius.

References

testacea
Beetles described in 1787